Budapest Noir is the first Hungarian noir written by Vilmos Kondor and published by HarperCollins in Hungary in February 2012. The novel is about a crime journalist Zsigmond Gordon, who wants to find the killer of a Jewish girl found dead in Budapest in 1936, and besides the criminal element offers social commentary, political and historical background of Hungary flirting with fascism.

Plot introduction
Budapest, October 1936. Prime Minister Gyula Gömbös is dead. The body of a young Jewish girl is found in a Terézváros doorway. Zsigmond Gordon, a criminal journalist for The Est newspaper, arrives on the scene soon afterwards and starts asking questions, but everywhere seems to run into a brick wall. The clues lead him upwards to the highest echelons of society and downwards to the lowest depths of misery and poverty. Gordon refuses to give up, keeps asking his questions, and the more they want to frighten him off, the more determined he becomes. He does not know whom to trust, and does not know and does not care how many people's interests he is harming. He just wants to find the girl's killer, because, by the look of things, he is the only one who cares.

Critical reception

Several reviewers hailed Budapest Noir as the first noir novel written in Hungarian.

"The search [for a Hungarian crime thriller] is at an end: Vilmos Kondor’s novel is a Hungarian crime thriller and then some, one of the harder variety, in the spirit of Raymond Chandler and Dashiell Hammett, but with Hungarian characters and set in the Hungarian capital in the period before World War II." Péter I. Rácz in 

Steven Saylor writes that the novel fulfills its promise:
"Budapest Noir more than fulfills the expectations piqued by its title. With intrepid news reporter Zsigmond Gordon as our guide, the novel takes us down the mean streets of one of Europe's most fascinating cities during one of its darkest chapters."

Sequels
Budapest Noir is the first novel in the series of five. It was followed by Bűnös Budapest (Budapest Sin), A budapesti kém (The Budapest Spy), Budapest romokban (Budapest in Ruins) and in 2012 the final installment titled Budapest novemberben (Budapest in November').

Publication history

2008, Hungary, Agave Könyvek , Pub date February 2008, Paperback.
2012, HarperCollins , Pub date January 2012, Paperback.

Film adaptation
The rights for the movie were sold before the book was published, and the film was released in 2017

Foreign editions
As of August 1, 2012, 'Budapest Noir' has been published by 
Edizioni e/o in Italy
Payot et Rivages in France
Proszynski i S-ka in Poland
 Mynx in Netherlands
Droemer Knaur in Germany

Other similar stories
 The 1993 trilogy Berlin Noir by Philip Kerr
 The 2000 novel Kingdom of Shadows by Alan Furst
 The 2009 novel Shadows and Light by Jonathan Rabb

References

External links
The Official website of Budapest Noir
Péter I. Rácz's review of Budapest Noir in Hungarian in ÉS
Krisztina Horeczky's review of Budapest Noir in Hungarian in Népszabadság
Krisztián Benyovszky's review of Budapest Noir in Hungarian in Új Szó in Bratislava

2008 novels
Hungarian novels
Fiction set in 1936
Novels set in Budapest
HarperCollins books